Michael Evan Willemse (born 14 February 1993) is a South African rugby union player for  in Premiership Rugby. His regular position is hooker.

Career

Youth and Varsity Rugby
Willemse was included in the  squad at the 2010 Under-18 Academy Week and also played for the  team in the Under-19 Provincial Championship competition in the same year. In 2011, he also represented them at the Craven Week competition.

Western Province / Stormers
He was called up to the  Vodacom Cup squad at the conclusion of the Varsity Cup competition and made his first class debut on 13 April 2013 against Argentina side  and made four appearances in the competition.

He made his Currie Cup debut a few months later when he came off the substitutes' bench for their match against  following Tiaan Liebenberg's late withdrawal through injury.

UK
On 25 March 2019, Willemse would travel to Scotland to sign for Edinburgh in the Pro14 on a two-year deal from the 2019-20 season. Following his release from Edinburgh, he signed for English club London Irish in the Premiership Rugby from the 2021-22 season.

Representative rugby
In 2013, he was included in the South Africa Under-20 squad for the 2013 IRB Junior World Championship. He made three substitute appearance – against the USA (scoring two tries), England, and France.

References

South African rugby union players
Living people
1993 births
Rugby union players from Cape Town
Western Province (rugby union) players
Stormers players
Rugby union hookers
South Africa Under-20 international rugby union players
Southern Kings players
Eastern Province Elephants players
Golden Lions players
Edinburgh Rugby players
London Irish players